The 2009–10 Wichita State Shockers men's basketball team represented Wichita State University in the 2009–10 NCAA Division I men's basketball season. The team, which plays in the Missouri Valley Conference (MVC), was led by third-year head coach Gregg Marshall. The Shockers were preseason rank #77 in Rivals.com's Preseason 1-347 Rankings. They were also picked to finish 4th in the MVC by Rivals and 5th by the MVC Committee. The Shockers played their 2009-10 home games at Charles Koch Arena, on the campus of Wichita State University. The Shockers finished the season 25–10, 12–6 in MVC play, lost in the championship game of the 2010 Missouri Valley Conference men's basketball tournament and were invited to the 2010 National Invitation Tournament where they lost in the first round to Nevada. They finish the season with an RPI of 68, much below their season average of 55. The Shockers also received votes in the AP Coaches Poll in the season, going as high as the #34 spot.

Roster
The team had 15 players on the roster.

2009-10 Schedule and results
Source

|-
!colspan=9 style=| Exhibition

|-
!colspan=9 style=| Regular Season

|-
!colspan=9 style=| Missouri Valley tournament

|-
!colspan=9 style=| NIT

|-

References

Wichita State Shockers men's basketball seasons
Wichita State Shockers
Wichita State
2009 in sports in Kansas
Shock